The Western Ultimate League (WUL) is a professional women's ultimate league in the western United States founded in 2020. The WUL's stated mission is to "promote visibility, opportunity, and equity within women's ultimate."

The WUL was formed to parallel the Premier Ultimate League (PUL), another women's ultimate league established in 2019, with an eye toward a future merger. The WUL shares resources and communicates closely with the PUL.

History 
The WUL started with a 2017 and 2018 series of women's and mixed showcase games affiliated with the American Ultimate Disc League, and a 2019 series of professional women's showcase games along the west coast including games between Seattle, Portland, and Vancouver-based teams and between Los Angeles and San Diego-based teams.

The inaugural 2020 Western Ultimate League season began with tryouts in January and February 2020 with seven teams. Competition, which had been set to begin in March 2020 and continue through May, was postponed and then canceled due to the COVID-19 pandemic. 

In January 2021, the Portland Swifts announced they were withdrawing from the WUL. The six remaining WUL teams first competed in December 2021 at the Winter Cup in San Diego. The Utah Wild emerged victorious, while two plays from the Winter Cup were featured by ESPN SportsCenter. After the Winter Cup, the league announced the addition of a seventh team, the Oregon Onyx.

The first regular season was conducted in 2022, with the Seattle Tempest emerging as champions. In October 2022, the league announced the addition an eighth team, the Colorado Alpenglow.

Teams 
The WUL currently consists of eight teams.

References

External links 
 Arizona Sidewinders
 Colorado Alpenglow
 Los Angeles Astra
 Oregon Onyx
 San Diego Super Bloom
 San Francisco Falcons
 Seattle Tempest
 Utah Wild

Ultimate (sport)